The Burning Spear Society, commonly referred to as Burning Spear or Spear, is a secret society of students and alumni at Florida State University in Tallahassee, Florida, founded in 1993. Although little information is publicly available on the dealings of the organization, members have cited the provision of political, professional and financial support of student leaders and efforts that strengthen the public standing of Florida State University. While its membership and processes are closely guarded, it is believed that, in addition to notable alumni, students deemed influential from established campus organizations are tapped to join the ranks each semester, hailing from various factions of campus such as the Student Government Association, Greek Life Councils, the Student Alumni Association, Seminole Student Boosters, and the Garnet & Gold Key Honor Society.

In its nearly thirty years of existence, Burning Spear has become one of the most secretive and influential secret societies on American campuses.

History 
Burning Spear was founded on July 14, 1993 by three students. Perhaps the most notable of its three founders is famed lawyer and activist Benjamin Crump, who has been involved in some of the most notable civil rights cases of the 21st century. By August 1993, sixteen students joined together to charter this new organization, and within one year's time seven additional students would be initiated into membership. The original intention of the group was to promote the Heisman campaign for Charlie Ward, which was successful. This newfound influence provided incentive to further and expand the goals of the organization.

Events

Burning Spear serves as the host of the Clock & Seal annual homecoming banquet at FSU. Former keynote speakers of Clock & Seal include:

 Florida Trend publisher Lynda Keever
 Florida Supreme Court Justice Raoul Cantero
 Former Florida Senate President  and past Florida State University President John Thrasher
 United States Senator Bill Nelson 
 Governor Charlie Crist
 Seminole Boosters Director Charlie Barnes
 NFL All-Pro Derrick Brooks 
 Representative Ray Sansom
 NFL All-Pro Marvin Jones 
 Football Coach Jimbo Fisher

Burning Spear also sponsors the Seminole Spirit Drum, which beats nonstop outside of Doak Campbell Stadium for 72 hours prior to a football game against a major rival.

The organization is also responsible for the Guardian of the Flame Awards, recognizing faculty member excellence annually and helped coordinate FSU Head Football Coach Jimbo Fisher's Kidz 1st Fund.

Controversies
 
Burning Spear has claimed existence for only twenty-six years, but there are dissenting opinions that say the society has operated in one form or another for a much longer time. Their extensive control of campus and state politics has been compared to that of The Machine at the University of Alabama and the Skull and Bones society of Yale University.

There are a large number of Burning Spear alumni from Florida State now in the legislature and the organization is also said to control a political action committee that gives campaign contributions to candidates that attended Florida State. Multiple Student Government Association Political Party leaders have also openly claimed affiliation, including several elected Student Body Presidents.

Leaked organizational manual
A leaked manual titled "Spear Night Ceremony: Procedures for Conducting Spear Night.", appearing to have been updated as of 2013, which confirms that the Burning Spear Society has "multiple members currently serving public office" and "alumni involved on every level of state government." Additionally, the manual outlines the internal practices of the Society, and their dedication to secrecy, quoting in part; "What is said here today, or in any other Burning Spear meeting is 100% secret. This is not open to interpretation. Burning Spear is 100% secret. Breaking this vow of secrecy will result in your immediate removal and a potential lawsuit. Your friends, family, roommates, brothers/sisters and girl/boyfriends will not know when you are at a Burning Spear meeting. If they find out and we find out that they know, you will be removed, immediately and without question."The manual also goes on to reference to Tenets of the Society, including "You will never ever speak against a fellow member of Burning Spear in public. Doing so will result in immediate removal. We command loyalty to a fault.", and "Burning Spear is not a democracy. _ is the President and that means with few exceptions, what (she/he) says, goes. The Student President reports directly to the corporate Board of Directors, specifically the Chairman.  is the Chairman of the Board of Directors''

References

External links
Burning Spear
Noles beat the drum before the Gators: Burning Spear's Drum Tour promotes Seminole spirit with 72 hours of continuous drumming
Harvard/Yale vs. Miami/Florida St.
Clock & Seal Homecoming Banquet

Honor societies
Student societies in the United States
Florida State University
1993 establishments in Florida
Student organizations established in 1993